The Leica R bayonet mount is a camera lens mount system introduced by Leitz in 1964. The R mount is the standard method of connecting a lens to the Leica R series of 35 mm single-lens reflex cameras. The mount is descended from those used for the Leicaflex, Leicaflex SL and Leicaflex SL2 SLR cameras, but differs in the cams used to communicate lens aperture information to the camera. 3 cam lenses are compatible with all of the Leica SLR cameras, while R-only lenses have a slightly different mount shape that will not fit on the earlier cameras.

The flange focal distance between mount and film is 47 mm.

On 5 March 2009, Leica announced plans to cease production of its R-Series manual focus SLR and lenses.

R Mount camera bodies

Leicaflex

Leica R

R mount lenses
1 cam
The original Leicaflex 1 cam lenses have a single sloped cam that communicates aperture setting to the camera. They can be used on later SL / SL2 and R-series cameras in stop-down metering mode only. Leica do not recommend that 1 cam lenses be used on R8 or R9 cameras because of possible damage to the cameras' ROM contacts. 1 cam lenses may be fitted with later 2 cams, 3 cams, or R cam + ROM contacts (replacing the sloped cams).

2 cam
2 cam lenses have two sloped cams for the Leicaflex SL and SL2 with TTL metering and are fully compatible with the original Leicaflex. They can be used on R series cameras with the same limitation and warning as 1 cam lenses and may also be fitted with later cams.

3 cam
3 cam lenses were introduced with R series cameras and have the earlier sloped cams and a third stepped "R-Cam" that communicates aperture information. They will work with all Leica SLR models since they have all three mechanical connections.

R only
These lenses only have the stepped R-cam and only work on R-series cameras. The mount is deliberately slightly incompatible with Leicaflex models and will not fit. They may be converted to ROM by a technician.

ROM
These only have the stepped R-cam plus electrical contacts communicating focal length to the camera. This is only supported on the R8/R9 although the lenses are fully compatible with all R-series cameras. The additional information is used in flash metering and communicated to the flash unit where it can be used to set power and flash zoom correctly and also to the optional Digital Module allowing lens focal length to be recorded with other image data.

Earlier 1, 2, or 3 cam lenses may be upgraded to ROM but this entails removal of both sloped cams, meaning that the lens will no longer be compatible with Leicaflex series cameras.

Table

Use with other cameras
The flange focal distance of 47 mm is fairly large, meaning that few other systems' lenses can be adapted to fit on a Leica R and retain infinity focus, but R lenses can be converted to other systems. The distance is only 0.5 mm larger than the Nikon F-mount, which is not sufficient to make a workable adapter, however, at least one Nikon camera has been modified with a Leica R bayonet mount to take R lenses, and at least two manufacturers make replacement mounts, allowing many Leica R lenses to be used directly on various camera systems, such as Nikon F mount cameras.
For this purpose, the cams need to be removed, which is not always possible (e.g. early Elmarit-R f/2.8 35mm). The mounting flange may then need to be machined to allow free movement of the remaining cam.
Sometimes, it is wise to refit the inner black anti-reflection ring, to avoid reflections within the focus mechanism (e.g. Elmarit-R f/2.8 90mm or Elmarit-R f/2.8 135mm). A further point of consideration is whether the protrusion on the rear lens block will engage with the mirror of the target SLR. For some Nikon cameras, this may be an issue.

Chips can also be attached to provide focal length and maximum aperture recognition in the camera body, which provides Exif in digital cameras.

A number of manufacturers have produced adapters to allow Canon EOS cameras to take R lenses, these operate only in stop-down metering mode but function well when rapid operation is not required.

See also

 Leica M-mount
 Leica Camera
 Single-lens reflex camera

References

External links
 
 

 
 
Lens mounts